The 1889 New York state election was held on November 5, 1889, to elect the Secretary of State, the State Comptroller, the Attorney General, the State Treasurer, the State Engineer and a judge of the New York Court of Appeals, as well as all members of the New York State Assembly and the New York State Senate.

History
The Prohibition state convention met on September 4 and 5 at Shakespeare Hall in Syracuse, New York. Prof. Alphonso A. Hopkins presided. Jesse H. Griffen, a Quaker of Yorktown, was nominated for Secretary of State; Joseph W. Bruce for Treasurer; Benjamin L. Rand, a 30-year-old banker of Tonawanda, for Treasurer; Alpheus B. Kenyon, a professor of Alfred University, for State Engineer; and Coleridge A. Hart, a 35-year-old lawyer of New York City, for Attorney General; and Walter Farrington for the Court of Appeals.

The Republican state convention met on September 25 at Saratoga Springs, New York, and nominated John I. Gilbert, of Franklin County, for Secretary of State; Martin W. Cooke, of Monroe County, for Comptroller; Ira M. Hedges, of Rockland County, for Attorney General; James M. Varnum, of New York City, for Treasurer; William V. Van Rensselaer for State Engineer; and Albert Haight for the Court of Appeals.

The Democratic state convention met on October 1 at the Alhambra in Syracuse, New York. Lt. Gov. Edward F. Jones was Temporary and Permanent Chairman. Frank Rice was nominated for Secretary of State by acclamation. Comptroller Edward Wemple was re-nominated on the first ballot (vote: Wemple 265, Edward A. Maher 115½). Wemple's nomination was not "made unanimous." Attorney General Charles F. Tabor was re-nominated on the first ballot (vote: Tabor 266, John Foley 115). State Engineer John Bogart was re-nominated by acclamation. Ex-Attorney General Denis O'Brien (in office 1884-1887) was nominated unanimously for the Court of Appeals after the name of Edward S. Rapallo had been proposed but withdrawn considering the ballots for Comptroller and Attorney General. The ticket, composed by Gov. David B. Hill and ordered to be pushed through the convention, had actually been published two days before the delegates met.

Members of the disbanding Greenback Party met on October 21 at the Grand Central Hotel in New York City. George O. Jones presided. They nominated Thomas K. Beecher for Secretary of State; J. Madison Hall, of Madison County, for Treasurer; John B. Sullivan, of Westchester County, for Comptroller; and James Wright, of Wayne County, for Attorney General.

Results
The whole Democratic ticket was elected.

The incumbents Wemple, Tabor and Bogart were re-elected.

Notes

Sources
The tickets: LIST OF ALL THE CANDIDATES TO BE VOTED FOR IN NEW-YORK CITY ON TUESDAY in NYT on November 3, 1889
The Democratic candidates: THE CANDIDATES in NYT on October 2, 1889
Result: OFFICIAL VOTE OF NEW-YORK STATE CAST AT THE ELECTION HELD ON TUESDAY, NOV. 5, 1889 in NYT on December 6, 1889
Result in New York City: THE CITY VOTE in NYT on November 21, 1889
The ballot reform, and how to vote: BALLOT REFORM APPLIED TO THIS ELECTION in NYT on November 4, 1889

See also
New York state elections

1889
1889 New York (state) elections